Muraltia is a genus of plants in the milkwort family (Polygalaceae) which is native to Southern and Eastern Africa. Most of the species are endemic to South Africa, and one species is naturalized in Australia. It is named after Johannes von Muralt, a Swiss botanist and surgeon. 

In 2006 the genus Nylandtia, which contained two species, was merged into Muraltia. The two species formerly part of Nylandtia are Muraltia scoparia and Muraltia spinosa. Nylandtia are commonly known as "Tortoise berry" plants ("skilpadbessie"). This is because of the bright edible berries that they produce, which are relished by the tortoise species of the fynbos.

Description
Muraltia are perennial, ericoid shrublets or shrubs. Their small flowers and sessile or have short stalks. usually have 3 petals and 5 sepals which are usually subequal. Their fruits contain 2 seeds. Their capsules are flat, membranous, and usually 4-horned. Its seeds are pubescent.

Species
As of July 2020, there are 118 accepted Muraltia species:

 Muraltia acerosa
 Muraltia acicularis
 Muraltia acipetala
 Muraltia aciphylla
 Muraltia alba
 Muraltia alopecuroides
 Muraltia alticola
 Muraltia angulosa
 Muraltia angustiflora
 Muraltia arachnoidea
 Muraltia aspalatha
 Muraltia aspalathoides
 Muraltia asparagifolia
 Muraltia barkerae
 Muraltia bolusii
 Muraltia bondii
 Muraltia brachyceras
 Muraltia brachypetala
 Muraltia caledonensis
 Muraltia calycina
 Muraltia capensis
 Muraltia carnosa
 Muraltia chamaepitys
 Muraltia ciliaris
 Muraltia cliffortiifolia
 Muraltia collina
 Muraltia commutata
 Muraltia comptonii
 Muraltia concava
 Muraltia crassifolia
 Muraltia curvipetala
 Muraltia cuspifolia
 Muraltia cyclolopha
 Muraltia decipiens
 Muraltia demissa
 Muraltia depressa
 Muraltia diabolica
 Muraltia dispersa
 Muraltia divaricata
 Muraltia dumosa
 Muraltia elsieae
 Muraltia empetroides
 Muraltia empleuridioides
 Muraltia ericifolia
 Muraltia ericoides
 Muraltia ferox
 Muraltia filiformis
 Muraltia flanaganii
 Muraltia gillettiae
 Muraltia guthriei
 Muraltia harveyana
 Muraltia heisteria
 Muraltia hirsuta
 Muraltia horrida
 Muraltia hyssopifolia
 Muraltia juniperifolia
 Muraltia karroica
 Muraltia knysnaensis
 Muraltia lancifolia
 Muraltia langebergensis
 Muraltia leptorhiza
 Muraltia lewisiae
 Muraltia lignosa
 Muraltia longicuspis
 Muraltia macowanii
 Muraltia macrocarpa
 Muraltia macroceras
 Muraltia macropetala
 Muraltia minuta
 Muraltia mitior
 Muraltia mixta
 Muraltia montana
 Muraltia muirii
 Muraltia muraltioides
 Muraltia mutabilis
 Muraltia namaquensis
 Muraltia obovata
 Muraltia occidentalis
 Muraltia ononidifolia
 Muraltia orbicularis
 Muraltia origanoides
 Muraltia oxysepala
 Muraltia pageae
 Muraltia paludosa
 Muraltia pappeana
 Muraltia pauciflora
 Muraltia pillansii
 Muraltia plumosa
 Muraltia polyphylla
 Muraltia pottebergensis
 Muraltia pubescens
 Muraltia pungens
 Muraltia rara
 Muraltia rhamnoides
 Muraltia rigida
 Muraltia rosmarinifolia
 Muraltia rubeacea
 Muraltia salsolacea
 Muraltia satureioides
 Muraltia saxicola
 Muraltia schlechteri
 Muraltia scoparia Goldblatt & Manning
 Muraltia serpylloides
 Muraltia serrata
 Muraltia spicata
 Muraltia spinosa Dumort. 
 Muraltia splendens
 Muraltia squarrosa
 Muraltia stenophylla
 Muraltia stipulacea
 Muraltia tenuifolia
 Muraltia thunbergii
 Muraltia thymifolia
 Muraltia trinervia
 Muraltia vulnerans
 Muraltia vulpina

References

Polygalaceae
Fabales genera